In the Shadow of the Moon: A Challenging Journey to Tranquility is a 2007 non-fiction book by space historians Francis French and Colin Burgess. Drawing on a number of original personal interviews with astronauts, cosmonauts and those who worked closely with them, the book chronicles the American and Soviet programs from 1965 onwards, through the Gemini, Soyuz and early Apollo flights, up to the first landing on the Moon by Apollo 11.

The book is the second volume in the Outward Odyssey spaceflight history series by the University of Nebraska Press.

Although the book shares its name with a documentary, and both include many original interviews with Apollo lunar astronauts, it is neither a source of, nor a tie-in to, the documentary.

The book was named as a finalist for the 2007 Eugene M. Emme Award for Astronautical Literature given by the American Astronautical Society, and named as "2009 Outstanding Academic Title" by Choice magazine.

External links
 In the Shadow of the Moon Official Publisher Site
 In the Shadow of the Moon book review by Hugo-nominated reviewer Steven H Silver
2007 AAS Emme Award finalist announcements

2007 non-fiction books
Spaceflight books